The Men's +105 kg competition at the 2017 World Weightlifting Championships was held on 5 December 2017.

Schedule

Medalists

Records

Results

New records

References

External links
Results 

Men's +105 kg